The 2022–23 South Florida Bulls men's basketball team represented the University of South Florida during the 2022–23 NCAA Division I men's basketball season. The season marked the 51st basketball season for USF, the tenth as a member of the American Athletic Conference, and the sixth season under head coach Brian Gregory. The Bulls played their home games at Yuengling Center on the university's Tampa, Florida campus.

Previous season
The Bulls finished the 2021–22 season 8–22, 3–15 in AAC play to finish in last place. They lost in the first round to UCF in the first round of the AAC tournament.

Offseason

Departures

Incoming transfers

Recruiting classes

2022 recruiting class

2023 recruiting class

Roster

Schedule and results

|-
!colspan=12 style=| Exhibition

|-
!colspan=12 style=| Non-conference regular season

|-
!colspan=12 style=| AAC Regular Season

|-
!colspan=12 style=| AAC tournament

Source

References

South Florida Bulls men's basketball seasons
South Florida Bulls
South Florida Bulls men's b
South Florida Bulls men's b